Clube Atlético Hermann Aichinger, or Atlético Ibirama as they are usually called, is a currently inactive Brazilian football team from Ibirama in Santa Catarina, founded on September 20, 1951. The club competed in the Brazilian Championship Third Level in 2004 and 2005.

History

Clube Atlético Hermann Aichinger was founded on September 20, 1951, succeeding Sociedade Desportiva Industrial, a team created in July 1944. The foundation meeting occurred at Geraldo Stoll Bar. The club's first president was Alberto Lessa, and both the club's football field and head office were rented. It is named after Hermann Aichinger, who donated the groundplot where the club's field and headquarters were built.

In 2004, Hermann Aichinger competed in the Brazilian Championship Third Level, reaching the third stage of the competition.

Stadium

Home stadium is the Estádio Hermann Aichinger, which is commonly known as Estádio da Baixada. It has a maximum capacity of 6,000 spectators. Record attendance was on April 17, 2005, when 6,022 spectators saw in the decisive match for the State Championship the 0-1 defeat against Criciúma.

Honors

 Campeonato Catarinense Second Division: 1993, 2001
 Amateur State Championship: 1992

References

External links
Official Website

 
Association football clubs established in 1951
Football clubs in Santa Catarina (state)
1951 establishments in Brazil